The Bréguet 500 Colmar was a 1940s French airliner designed by Bréguet Aviation. Two prototypes were built during the Second World War but only one survived to fly in 1945. The prototype went on to operate as a VIP transport with the French Air Force but no others were built.

Design and development
Originally started under the designation 483T, the Colmar was designed as a twin-engined airliner or VIP and staff transport, based on the earlier four-engined Bréguet 482 bomber. It was an all-metal mid-wing cantilever monoplane with twin fins and rudders and retractable tailwheel landing gear. The fuselage cabin was divided into two due to the main spar, up to six passengers in the forward cabin and 17 in the rear. Work started at Montaudran on two prototypes during the German occupation which were given the designation Bréguet 500 Colmar. In April 1944 one of the almost completed prototypes was destroyed by the Royal Air Force during a bombing raid on the factory.

Following the liberation of France, the surviving prototype, powered by two Gnome-Rhône 14R-04 / Gnome-Rhône 14R-05 radial engines, first flew on 27 February 1945.  Plans to put the type into production as the Bréguet 510 Colmar were abandoned, and, after testing, the sole Colmar was delivered to the French Air Force for use as a VIP transport. The Colmar was withdrawn from service in October 1947 and scrapped.

Operators

French Air Force

Variants
500 Colmar
Twin-engined airliner prototype, one built and one destroyed before completion.
510 Colmar
Proposed production variant with longer fuselage, not built.

Specifications (500 Colmar)

Notes

Bibliography

1940s French airliners
 0500
Mid-wing aircraft
Aircraft first flown in 1945
Twin piston-engined tractor aircraft